Wherever You Are, also known as Lifelines, is a 2008 comedy-drama film from director-screenwriter Rob Margolies.  The film addresses the changes within a dysfunctional family after 1 session of therapy.  It is noted for having been filmed in 11 days.

Release
The film had its premiere at the Rhode Island International Film Festival.  As of September 2008 it is playing film festivals and it was scheduled for limited release in November 2008.  The film has also been presented under the title Lifelines at some festivals.

Reception
Roger Ebert wrote, "Wherever You Are is a fine, strong film. The most impressive thing is how confident and economical the direction is, and how powerful the performances are!"

References

2008 films
2008 comedy-drama films
2008 directorial debut films
2008 independent films
American comedy-drama films
American independent films
2000s English-language films
2000s American films